Hafsat Ahmad Idris (born 14 July 1987) is a Nigerian film actress in the Kannywood film industry. She participated in her first movie called Barauniya (2016). She won the 2019 female actress award.

Early life and career
Hafsat is an indigene of Kano State, in northern part of Nigeria. She was born and raised in Shagamu, Ogun State. She made her first appearance in Kannywood in a movie titled Barauniya, she featured alongside Ali Nuhu, and Jamila Nagudu,.

In 2018, Hafsat established a film production company known as Ramlat Investment. She has produced a number of movies in 2019 including Kawaye in which actors such as Ali Nuhu, Sani Musa Danja and herself. She cleared the air that she is not married to Abacha's son.

Awards

Filmography
Hafsat has featured in numerous movies, including the following:

See also
 List of Nigerian actors
 List of Nigerian film producers
 List of Kannywood actors

References

1984 births
Nigerian film actresses
Hausa-language mass media
Living people
Actresses in Hausa cinema
21st-century Nigerian actresses
Hausa people
Kannywood actors
Actresses from Kano State
Nigerian film producers
Nigerian film directors
People from Kano State
Nigerian film award winners